Charles Howard "Dick" Ellis  (1895–1975), was an Australian-born British intelligence officer who is alleged to have also been a double agent for Germany and the Soviet Union.
According to British author Nigel West, the Secret Intelligence Service (SIS or MI6) believed that Ellis had been a spy for Nazi Germany's military-intelligence unit, the Abwehr. Ellis was accused by British author Chapman Pincher of being a traitor. During the 1980s, Prime Minister Margaret Thatcher's refusal to confirm or deny Pincher's allegation caused distress to the Ellis family.

Early years
Ellis was born in Sydney, Australia, to parents who had emigrated from Devon, England, and spent his early life in Melbourne and Tasmania. In 1914, he travelled to England, intending to study at Oxford University.

Military service
Following the outbreak of the First World War (1914–18), Dick Ellis enlisted as a Private in the Territorial Force, and became part of the 100th Provisional Battalion, which later was renamed the 29th (CITY OF LONDON) Battalion. He saw action on the Western Front and was wounded three times, before being commissioned as an officer in September 1917. In 1918, he transferred to the Intelligence Corps and there served for several months, before the Armistice of 11 November 1918. In 1919, Ellis then was sent to Transcaspia, as part of the Malleson mission against the Bolsheviks in Turkmenistan; and he participated in the Afghan War of 1919; that same year, Ellis was awarded the OBE (military) for being a good soldier.

Intelligence career
After leaving the army, Ellis resumed his studies, learning Russian at St Edmund Hall, Oxford and the Sorbonne.

He joined the Secret Intelligence Service in Paris in 1923. Ellis held diplomatic and consular posts in Turkey and the Balkans. In December 1923, Ellis became British vice-consul in Berlin and later worked in Vienna and Geneva as foreign correspondent for the Morning Post. While in Geneva, Ellis wrote a major book on the League of Nations. Although for long attributed to British-Finnish League official Konni Zilliacus, it has been proven that Ellis was the real author. In 1938 he was brought back to England to supervise the German embassy's telephone lines. Ribbentrop's staff soon developed an uncharacteristic discretion during telephone conversations. Ellis was subsequently sent to Liverpool to establish a mail censorship centre.

In summer 1940 he became deputy-head of British Security Co-ordination in New York. Here, in the period before Pearl Harbor, Ellis briefed J Edgar Hoover in counter-espionage techniques. He provided the blueprint from which William J. Donovan was able to set up the Office of Strategic Services and consequently was awarded the American Legion of Merit.

At the end of the War he was appointed a CBE for his work.

In 1945, the SIS learned from captured German spy controller Walter Schellenberg that a man named Ellis had betrayed the organisation. However, it failed to act and Pincher believes that Ellis was subsequently blackmailed into spying for the Soviets.

Ellis was subsequently sent to Singapore on the staff of the United Kingdom Commissioner-General for South-East Asia. He was 'controller Western Hemisphere' and 'controller Far East' during the early 1950s. Ellis also helped set up the Australian Secret (Intelligence) Service. He retired in 1953 and was awarded the CMG.

A lengthy investigation into the allegations against Ellis was code-named "Emerton". A former in-house CIA historian, Thomas F. Troy, stated that James Angleton had warned him in 1963 that Ellis was under investigation as a suspected Soviet agent. Pincher alleged that in 1965 Ellis was challenged and admitted to spying for Germany. The Independent'''s James Dalrymple said that Ellis 'sold "vast quantities of information" about the British secret service to the Germans', aiding the production of the Gestapo handbook for the Invasion of Britain.

Malleson mission

In retirement C. H. Ellis wrote a book about the Malleson mission: The Transcaspian Episode. Among the incidents addressed in the book was the execution of 26 Commissars – including Stepan Shahumyan  – of a Soviet client, the Centrocaspian Dictatorship, in September 1918. The commissars had earlier fled the Mussavatist Azerbaijan advanced guard in the September Days of 1918 just before the Turks occupied Baku. They planned to sail to Astrakhan, the only Caspian port still in Bolshevik hands but were instead dumped at the port of Krasnovodsk where they were summarily executed by the local Menshevik garrison. Ellis fundamentally disagreed with claims by the Socialist Revolutionary journalist Vadim Chaikin that British officers were responsible for the deaths of the Commisars, pointing out that it had been a triumph for Soviet propaganda. In a letter to The Times in 1961, Ellis placed the blame with the "Menshevik-Socialist Revolutionary" Transcaspian Government, which had jurisdiction over the prisoners.  According to Ellis the claim of British involvement arose only after the Socialist Revolutionaries found the need to ingratiate themselves with the stronger Bolsheviks.

Biography
Ellis is the subject of British-Australian author Jesse Fink's biography The Eagle in the Mirror''.

Footnotes

References
Ellis, C. H, "The British Intervention in Transcaspia 1918–1919" University of California Press, 1963
James Cotton, ‘”The Standard Work in English on the League” and Its Authorship: Charles Howard Ellis, an Unlikely Australian Internationalist’, History of European Ideas, 42:8, 1089-1104, 2016 DOI: 10.1080/01916599.2016.1182568

1895 births
1975 deaths
People from Sydney
Allied intervention in the Russian Civil War
Alumni of St Edmund Hall, Oxford
Officers of the Order of the British Empire
Commanders of the Order of the British Empire
Recipients of the Legion of Merit
Companions of the Order of St Michael and St George
British diplomats
Secret Intelligence Service personnel
World War II spies for Germany
Australian emigrants to England
Australian expatriates in England